The United Party was a political party in the Gambia. The party was founded during the colonial period and worked political in the then colony of Bathurst (the present capital of the Gambia, Banjul). The party drew support mainly from Roman Catholics. In Banjul it had support mainly amongst the Wolofs, in the rural areas mainly amongst Fulas. The party was led by P. S. Njie.

In 1963, the People's Progressive Party and DCA invited UP to join the government. After two years, the party left the government. Its position as an opposition party had declined, though. In 1970, the party suffered a heavy blow as its leader joined the PPP.

During the 1970s and 1980s the party strongly opposed a union with Senegal.

Election results

References 

Defunct political parties in the Gambia
Main